Rheinheimera perlucida is a Gram-negative, rod-shaped and motile bacterium from the genus of Rheinheimera which has been isolated from water from the Baltic Sea.

References 

Chromatiales
Bacteria described in 2006